Alan Dodd Code (born 1951) is Ward W. and Priscilla B. Woods Professor of Philosophy and Professor of Classics (by courtesy) at Stanford University, and also Professor Emeritus of Philosophy at UC Berkeley. He is a leading scholar of ancient Greek philosophy, especially well known for his articles on Aristotle's metaphysics, science, and logic.

Education and career

Code did his BA, MA, and PhD at the University of Wisconsin–Madison, writing his dissertation under Terry Penner. Before taking up a position at Stanford in 2011, he was Board of Governors Professor of Philosophy at Rutgers University. Prior to that, he taught for many years at Berkeley, and also at the University of Michigan and Ohio State University.

He was elected a Fellow of the American Academy of Arts and Sciences in 2013.

Philosophical work

Some of Code's papers are considered centrally important to the understanding of Aristotle's metaphysics and philosophy of science. He has commented on, clarified and extended the work of such eminent scholars as G. E. L. Owen and Montgomery Furth.

See also
American philosophy
List of American philosophers

References

External links
Faculty profile at Stanford

1951 births
20th-century American essayists
20th-century American philosophers
21st-century American essayists
21st-century American non-fiction writers
21st-century American philosophers
American logicians
American male essayists
American male non-fiction writers
American scholars of ancient Greek philosophy
Analytic philosophers
Aristotelian philosophers
Epistemologists
Historians of philosophy
Living people
Metaphysicians
Ohio State University faculty
Ontologists
Philosophers from California
Philosophers of history
Philosophers of literature
Philosophers of logic
Philosophers of science
Philosophy academics
Philosophy writers
Rutgers University faculty
Stanford University Department of Philosophy faculty
University of California, Berkeley College of Letters and Science faculty
University of Michigan faculty
University of Wisconsin–Madison alumni
20th-century American male writers
21st-century American male writers